The title Baron Buckhurst has been created twice; once in the Peerage of England and once in the Peerage of the United Kingdom.  It was first created in 1567 for Thomas Sackville, MP for East Grinstead and Aylesbury.  He was later created Earl of Dorset in 1604.  That creation became extinct in 1843.

It was next created in 1864 for Elizabeth Sackville-West, Countess De La Warr, the sister of the 4th Duke (and 10th Earl) of Dorset, wife of the 5th Earl De La Warr, with special remainder intended to keep it separate from the earldom. Lady De La Warr was thus succeeded in the barony by her second son.  When he also succeeded his brother as 7th Earl De La Warr, the Buckhurst title would have passed immediately to the next brother (Mortimer, later created Baron Sackville), but the House of Lords found such "shifting remainders" invalid (Buckhurst Peerage Case) and the titles became inseparable.

Barons Buckhurst (1567)
Thomas Sackville, 1st Earl of Dorset (c. 1536–1608), styled Lord Buckhurst from 1567 to 1604 
Richard Sackville, 3rd Earl of Dorset (1589–1624), styled Lord Buckhurst from 1608 to 1609
Richard Sackville, 5th Earl of Dorset (1622–1677), styled Lord Buckhurst from birth to 1652
Charles Sackville, 6th Earl of Dorset (1638-1706), styled Lord Buckhurst from 1652 to 1677
Lionel Sackville, 1st Duke of Dorset (1688–1765), styled Lord Buckhurst from birth to 1706
Charles Sackville, 2nd Duke of Dorset (1711–1769), styled Lord Buckhurst from birth to 1720

Barons Buckhurst (1864)
Elizabeth Sackville-West, Countess De La Warr and 1st Baroness Buckhurst (1795–1870)
Reginald Windsor Sackville, 2nd Baron Buckhurst (1817–1896), succeeded as 7th Earl De La Warr in 1873
Gilbert George Reginald Sackville, 8th Earl De La Warr (1869–1915)
Herbrand Sackville, 9th Earl De La Warr (1900–1976), styled Lord Buckhurst from birth to 1915
William Sackville, 10th Earl De La Warr (1921–1988), styled Lord Buckhurst from birth to 1976
William Sackville, 11th Earl De La Warr (born 1948), styled Lord Buckhurst from 1976 to 1988

See also
Earls of Dorset: Fourth creation (1604)
Earl De La Warr
Buckhurst Park, Sussex, seat of the barony

External links
Cope v Earl de la Warr, (1873) 8 Ch App 982, a court case about the effects of the 1873 succession.
Buckhurst Peerage Case, (1876) 2 App Cas 1, a Peerage Claim in the House of Lords about the effects of the 1873 succession.

Baron
Extinct baronies in the Peerage of England
Peerages created with special remainders
Baronies in the Peerage of the United Kingdom
Noble titles created in 1567
Noble titles created in 1864